Frederick C. "Fritz" Mackey (April 30, 1904 – July 2, 1987) was an American football and baseball player and coach. He served as the head football coach at Butler University from 1932 to 1934, compiling a record of 10–11–2. Mackey was also the head baseball coach at Ohio Wesleyan University from 1930 to 1932, and at his alma mater, Ohio State University, from 1939 to 1944, tallying a career college baseball coaching mark of 99–75.

Mackey played football and baseball at Ohio State, before graduating in 1926.  He was also an assistant football coach at Ohio State from 1935 to 1944 and a member of the staff for the national championship-winning 1942 Ohio State Buckeyes football team.  After leaving coaching, Mackey worked for an actuary firm.  He retired around 1970 to Sun City, Arizona, where he died in July 1987.

Head coaching record

Football

References

External links
 

1904 births
1987 deaths
Baseball catchers
Butler Bulldogs football coaches
Ohio State Buckeyes baseball coaches
Ohio State Buckeyes baseball players
Ohio State Buckeyes football coaches
Ohio State Buckeyes football players
Ohio Wesleyan Battling Bishops baseball coaches
Ohio Wesleyan Battling Bishops football coaches